Cosmopterix pallifasciella is a moth in the family Cosmopterigidae. It was described by Snellen in 1897. It is found on Java.

References

Natural History Museum Lepidoptera generic names catalog

Moths described in 1897
pallifasciella